This is a list of Atatürk Museums in Turkey. Most of these are historic buildings converted into museums, in which the founder of modern Turkey, Mustafa Kemal Atatürk (1881–1938), stayed during his visit to the location. Some are replicas of the houses, in which Atatürk stayed during his visits.

There are also two Atatürk houses abroad. One is the Atatürk Museum (Thessaloniki) in which Atatürk spent his childhood in Thessaloniki, Greece. The other one is Sarmadzhiev House in Sofia in which Atatürk lived during his diplomatic mission to Bulgaria. But the later is not a museum and it is now used as a part of Turkish embassy in Sofia.

References

 
Lists of buildings and structures in Turkey
Monuments and memorials in Turkey